"Absolute Beginners" is a song written and recorded by English singer-songwriter David Bowie. Released on 3 March 1986, it was the theme song to the 1986 film of the same name (itself an adaptation of the book Absolute Beginners).

Although the film was not a commercial success, the song was a big hit, reaching No. 2 on the UK Singles Chart. It also reached the top ten on the main singles charts in ten other countries. In the US, it peaked at No. 53 on the Billboard Hot 100.

Bowie performed "Absolute Beginners" live on his 1987 Glass Spider Tour, his 2000 "Mini" Tour, and his 2002 Heathen Tour. The song has been included on a number of Bowie's compilation and "Best-of" releases, and was included as a bonus track on the 1995 re-release of Tonight (1984).

Background and recording 
Bowie was good friends with the film's director, Julien Temple (who had worked with him in 1984 on the Jazzin' for Blue Jean short film). Bowie agreed to Temple's request to write music for the film if he could also play the part of Vendice Partners.

It was recorded at Clive Langer & Alan Winstanley's Westside Studios, London. The sessions were completed rapidly, but the song was delayed due to the problems with completing the film. Virgin wanted the release to tie in with the film's opening. The song featured Rick Wakeman on piano, who had previously performed on Bowie's "Space Oddity" single and Hunky Dory album. Shortly after the sessions wrapped, Mick Jagger flew in to record the charity cover of "Dancing in the Street" with Bowie, which used many of the same musicians. Bowie recorded the lead vocal of "Absolute Beginners" at Westside Studios in August.

Reception 
AllMusic described "Absolute Beginners" as "the gem of his post-Let's Dance '80s output, a big, breathtaking ballad allowing him to indulge the Sinatra croon that's driven many of his best performances".  It was chosen by Jeremy Allen in The Guardian as one of Bowie's "ten of the best" songs. Biographer Paul Trynka described "Absolute Beginners" as "Bowie's last great composition of the 1980s", while rock critic Chris O'Leary described it as "gorgeous and valedictory," with "one of the great Bowie melodies" in its refrain.  Mojo chose the song as number 61 in its countdown of Bowie's 100 greatest songs.  Don Weller's saxophone solo has been described by musicOMH as "perhaps the best" saxophone solo in a Bowie song. They characterised it as "the sound of one man trying to violently expel his innards through the bell of his instrument" and "one of the most heartbreaking things put to record".

Track listing 
All tracks are written by David Bowie, except where noted.

3" CD: Virgin  CDT 20 (UK) 

 "Absolute Beginners" – 8:03
 "Absolute Beginners (Dub Mix)" – 5:40

CD: Virgin  CDF 20 (UK) 

 "Absolute Beginners" – 8:03
 "Absolute Beginners (Dub Mix)" – 5:40

7": Virgin  VS 838 (UK) 

 "Absolute Beginners" – 5:36
 "Absolute Beginners (Dub Mix)" – 5:42

12": Virgin  VSG 838–12 (UK) 

 "Absolute Beginners (Full Length Version)" – 8:00
 "Absolute Beginners (Dub Mix)" – 5:42

 issued in a gatefold sleeve

12": EMI America  SPRO 9623 (US) 

 "Absolute Beginners (Edited Version)" – 4:46
 "Absolute Beginners (Full Length Version)" – 8:00

 includes exclusive "edited version"

Download: EMI  iVS 838 (UK) 

 "Absolute Beginners" – 5:36
 "Absolute Beginners (Full Length Version)" – 8:00
 "Absolute Beginners (Dub Mix)" – 5:42

Download: Amazon.com (US) 

 "Absolute Beginners" – 5:37
 "Absolute Beginners (Full Length Version)" – 8:03
 "Absolute Beginners (Dub Mix)" – 5:39
 "That's Motivation" – 4:14
 "Volare (Nel Blu Dipinto Di Blu)" (Comp.: Domenico Modugno) – 3:13

 Original release date (of E.P. download with added tracks 4 and 5): 28 May 2007

Music video 
Julien Temple shot the music video, which echoed the 1950s style of the movie. The video was a homage to an old British advert for Strand cigarettes. The ill-fated advertising tagline "You're never alone with a Strand" is quoted by Partners in the film. The video also uses footage from the film.

In 2016, Entertainment Weekly chose it as one of Bowie's 20 best music videos. They stated the video "does a far better job of expressing the noirish romanticism" of MacInnes' novel than the film did and also praised the "great dance-fighting scene at the end".

Personnel 

 Producers:
 Alan Winstanley
 Clive Langer
 Musicians:
David Bowie – vocals
Rick Wakeman – piano
Kevin Armstrong – guitar
Matthew Seligman – bass
Neil Conti – drums
Luís Jardim – percussion
Mac Gollehon – trumpet
John Thirkell – trumpet
Don Weller, Gary Barnacle, Paul "Shilts" Weimar, Willie Garnett, Andy MacKintosh, Gordon Murphy – saxophones
Steve Nieve – keyboards
Janet Armstrong – backing vocals

Gil Evans sings the refrain of the song in the film.

Live versions 
 The song was performed live during David Bowie's 1987 Glass Spider Tour and released on Glass Spider (1988/2007).
 Bowie's 25 June 2000 performance of the song at the Glastonbury Festival was released in 2018 on Glastonbury 2000.
 A live version recorded at BBC Radio Theatre, London, on 27 June 2000 was released on the bonus disc accompanying the first release of Bowie at the Beeb in 2000.
 It was performed live on several occasions on the 2002 Heathen Tour as a duet with bassist Gail Ann Dorsey; usually the song would end with Bowie and Dorsey dancing.  Mark Plati would play bass while she sang.

Other releases 
 In 1995, the full-length version appeared as a bonus track on the Virgin Records rerelease of the album Tonight.
 The 5:36 single version has appeared on the following compilations:
 Bowie: The Singles 1969–1993 (1993)
 The Singles Collection (1993)
 ChangesTwoBowie (1998 reissue)
 Best of Bowie (2002) (most editions)
 The Platinum Collection (2005)
 The Best of David Bowie 1980/1987 (2007)
 Nothing Has Changed (2014) (3-CD and vinyl editions)
 A 4:46 edit, released to promote the single in 1986, was included on the 1-CD and 2-CD editions of Nothing Has Changed and the 2-CD version of Bowie Legacy (2016).

Charts

Weekly charts

Year-end charts

References 

Pegg, Nicholas, The Complete David Bowie, Reynolds & Hearn Ltd, 2000, 

Film theme songs
1980s ballads
1986 singles
1986 songs
David Bowie songs
European Hot 100 Singles number-one singles
Irish Singles Chart number-one singles
Music videos directed by Julien Temple
Number-one singles in Finland
Songs written by David Bowie
Songs written for films
Virgin Records singles